Dvin is a village in the Artashat Municipality of the Ararat Province of Armenia. It is located near the ruins of the ancient city of Dvin.

References

World Gazeteer: Armenia – World-Gazetteer.com
Report of the results of the 2001 Armenian Census

Populated places in Ararat Province